Glavinitsa Peak is the peak rising to 1504 m in the central part of Rudozem Heights on German Peninsula, Fallières Coast in Graham Land, Antarctica.  It has precipitous and partly ice-free northwest and south slopes, and is surmounting Bader Glacier to the north and Bucher Glacier to the southwest.

The peak is named after the town of Glavinitsa in Northeastern Bulgaria.

Location
British mapping in 1978.

Maps
 British Antarctic Territory.  Scale 1:200000 topographic map. DOS 610 Series, Sheet W 67 66.  Directorate of Overseas Surveys, Tolworth, UK, 1978.
 Antarctic Digital Database (ADD). Scale 1:250000 topographic map of Antarctica. Scientific Committee on Antarctic Research (SCAR), 1993–2016.

Notes

References
 Glavinitsa Peak. SCAR Composite Antarctic Gazetteer
 Bulgarian Antarctic Gazetteer. Antarctic Place-names Commission. (details in Bulgarian, basic data in English)

External links
 Glavinitsa Peak. Copernix satellite image

Mountains of Graham Land
Bulgaria and the Antarctic
Fallières Coast